Iris Y. Martinez (born February 25, 1956) is an American politician and administrator.  In 2020, she was elected Clerk of the Circuit Court of Cook County.  She previously served as a member of the Illinois Senate, representing the 20th district since 2003. A member of the Democratic Party, she rose to Assistant Majority Leader in the State Senate.  As court clerk and as a state senator, she is the first Latina to have held either of those offices.

Early life 
Martinez is a graduate of Northeastern Illinois University and the University of Illinois at Chicago.

Senate career 
Senator Martinez was the first Latina woman to be elected to the Illinois State Senate. In her first year in Springfield, Martinez ensured that community agencies like the Children's Place, an agency that works with children and families affected by HIV and AIDS, and Concordia Avondale Community Center, which provides daycare, after-school programs and a center for seniors, received state funding to continue their programming. In 2003 Martinez sponsored legislation, introduced by then-Representative Sara Feigenholtz and later signed into law by Governor Rod Blagojevich, that requires health insurance companies to provide women with contraceptive coverage. In recognition of this legislation, Martinez received the Profile in Courage Award from Planned Parenthood. Martinez targeted Illinois drivers with out of state reckless homicide and DUI convictions with the passage of a new law. This law ensures that convictions received in other states are included in Illinois driving records and subject to state laws regarding further prosecution of these offences. To help protect consumers from becoming victims of identity theft, Martinez helped pass a law that requires all insurance cards be issued without a Social Security number.

In 2004, Martinez was awarded the Hillary Clinton Leadership Award, presented to an elected official by the Illinois Democratic Women's organization. Martinez was the Chairperson of the Pensions Committee and Vice Chairperson of the Housing and Community Affairs Committee, and was a member of three additional committees: Commerce, Health and Human Services, and Insurance.

In 2006, Martinez endorsed judicial candidate Ramon Ocasio III over the Cook County Democratic Party  endorsed candidate, Ed Lechowicz, the son of former State Senator Ted Lechowicz, saying she did so to increase the number of Latinos on the Cook County judiciary.

In 2008, Martinez faced a primary challenge from state representative Richard T. Bradley, who represented  half of her district in the House. Bradley had originally announced his intention to seek re-election to his former seat in the Illinois House but decided instead to challenge Martinez when Deb Mell announced her candidacy for his House seat. Martinez was re-elected, defeating Bradley and another candidate.

In 2018, J.B. Pritzker appointed Martinez to Powering Illinois’ Future transition committee, which is responsible for infrastructure and clean energy policies.

After her election to serve as the Clerk of the Circuit Court, local party leaders appointed Cristina Pacione-Zayas to the seat.

Clerk of the Circuit Court of Cook County

On August 14, 2019, Cook County Circuit Clerk Dorothy Brown announced that she would not seek reelection in 2020. Martinez later announced that she would seek the Democratic nomination for Circuit Clerk. Despite not being endorsed by the Cook County Democratic Party, Martinez won the primary with 33.73% of the vote and 50,000 more votes than party-endorsed candidate Michael Cabonargi. In addition to failing to receive the party's endorsement in the primary, she had also failed to receive other notable endorsements. Consequentially, her primary victory was regarded as an upset.

Martinez won the general election and was sworn in on December 1, 2020. She is the first Latina to serve in the position, and the second woman of color to hold the position.

Soon after taking office, Martinez complained about the state of the office she inherited from Dorothy Brown. In response, Brown released a statement that was highly critical of Martinez.

In November 2022, Martinez announced that the office of the clerk of courts had been relieved of federal oversight of its hiring and employment practices. The office had been under this oversight since August 2018 during the tenure of her predecessor.

Controversy

Democratic Party Committeeperson
Martinez was elected to the Democratic Party of Illinois State Central Committee in 2002, and to the Cook County Democratic Party Committee in 2020. In March 2022, Martinez hosted Chicago Fraternal Order of Police Lodge 7 president John Catanzara, a vocal supporter of former president Donald Trump, at a fundraiser for her ward political organization. Martinez also accepted  $7,000 in campaign contributions from Catanzara's FOP Lodge 7.

Later that year, she endorsed Erin Jones, a Northwest Side GOP Club committeeman and supporter of Donald Trump's effort to overturn the 2020 election, in a Democratic party primary for State Senate as part of a slate of candidates backed by both Martinez and the FOP. 

Martinez's support from and for MAGA Republican figures running in Democratic primaries drew sharp criticism from local progressive organizations. 

In June 2022, the FOP slate suffered "landslide" losses in the Democratic primaries, and Martinez lost her Democratic Party State Central Committee seat to Delia Ramirez.

Clerk of the Circuit Court of Cook County
Since assuming the office of Clerk of the Circuit Court of Cook County, Martinez has come under fire for her office's hiring practices and use political patronage. In March 2022, WBEZ reported that Martinez's office hired a former City of Evanston human resources director who was facing disciplinary review for “mishandling of sexual misconduct complaints from teenage girls and young women who worked at the city’s beaches” and was found to be "primarily at fault for Evanston’s yearlong delay in looking into the “pervasive” harassment and abuse suffered by lifeguards and other beach workers." 

In December 2022, the Chicago Tribune reported that 23 employees of the Clerk of the Circuit Court of Cook County's office hired by Iris Martinez performed political work for the 33rd Ward aldermanic campaign of Samie Martinez, a political protégé of Martinez, raising concerns about machine influence on the race. 

In January 2023, the Chicago Sun-Times reported that "more than 50 employees of Cook County Clerk of Court Iris Martinez" were under investigation for allegedly defrauding the federal Paycheck Protection Program loan program "intended to help small businesses struggling during the COVID-19 pandemic."

Electoral history

State Senate
2002

2004

2008

2012

2016

2018

Clerk of the Cook County Circuit Court
2020

References

External links
Iris Y. Martinez official Cook County Government page

1956 births
Living people
Clerks of the Circuit Court of Cook County
Hispanic and Latino American women in politics
Democratic Party Illinois state senators
Northeastern Illinois University alumni
University of Illinois Chicago alumni
Women state legislators in Illinois
21st-century American politicians
21st-century American women politicians
Hispanic and Latino American state legislators in Illinois